Raskot is an urban municipality located in Kalikot District of Karnali Province of Nepal.

The municipality is divided into total 9 wards.

The municipality was established on 10 March 2017, when Government of Nepal restricted all old administrative structure and announced 744 local level units as per the new constitution of Nepal 2015.

Sipkhana, Siuna and Phukot Village development committees were Incorporated to form this new municipality. The headquarters of the municipality is situated at Siuna.

References

External links
 http://www.raskotmun.gov.np/
 https://www.citypopulation.de/php/nepal-mun-admin.php?adm2id=6407

Populated places in Kalikot District
Municipalities in Karnali Province
Nepal municipalities established in 2017